Sarton is an unincorporated community in Monroe County, West Virginia, United States. Sarton is west of Union.

References

Unincorporated communities in Monroe County, West Virginia
Unincorporated communities in West Virginia